Kevin Lincoln (born 1980) is an American politician who was elected in 2021 as the mayor of Stockton, California.

Biography
Kevin Jeffery Lincoln was born October 28, 1980, in San Joaquin County, and raised in Stockton. His mother was of Mexican descent and his father was African American. In 2001, he joined the U.S. Marine Corps and served on Air Force One during the administration of George W. Bush.

He returned to California, and worked in Silicon Valley, for AlliedBarton in 2005-2008, Securitas AB in 2008-2009, and AlliedBarton again in 2009-2013. He then returned to Stockton and became executive pastor of LifeSong Church.

In the November 2020 general election, Lincoln defeated Democratic incumbent mayor Michael Tubbs to serve as mayor of Stockton. Municipal elections in California are officially nonpartisan; candidates' party affiliations do not appear on the ballot. Lincoln's party preference, however, is Republican.

References

African-American mayors in California
Living people
American politicians of Mexican descent
Hispanic and Latino American mayors in California
Mayors of Stockton, California
Year of birth uncertain
Black conservatism in the United States
Latino conservatism in the United States
1980 births